Sabawi Ibrahim al-Tikriti (27 February 1947 – 8 July 2013), half-brother of Saddam Hussein, was the leader of the Iraqi secret service, the Mukhabarat, at the time of the 1991 Gulf War. He was the head of the Directorate of General Security from 1991 to 1996, and later served as a presidential advisor to Hussein.

After the 2003 invasion of Iraq by a United States-led coalition, Sabawi went into hiding. On 27 February 2005, his arrest was made public. Sabawi was the six of Diamonds in the U.S. military's most-wanted Iraqi playing cards, and number 36 of the top 55 most-wanted Iraqis list. He was suspected of being behind explosions and killings that took place after the collapse of the former Iraqi regime, and a one-million dollar reward was offered for information leading to either his capture or death. Syria had captured Sawabi and turned him over to Iraqi forces. Iraqi troops in turn turned him over to U.S. forces. Syria was repeatedly charged with protecting former Iraqi officials, a charge the Syrian government always denied.

In March 2009, Sabawi was sentenced to death by hanging by a court in Baghdad. As his death sentence was read out, he stood up and proclaimed "God is great" and that he was proud to be a martyr. On 8 July 2013, Sabawi died of cancer.

His son, Ayman, also arrested by the U.S., was serving a life sentence when he escaped from prison on 9 December 2006. One of Ibrahim's brothers, Watban Ibrahim al-Tikriti, was also sentenced to death, while his other brother, Barzan Ibrahim al-Tikriti, was executed in 2007.

References

Tulfah family
Arab Socialist Ba'ath Party – Iraq Region politicians
2013 deaths
1947 births
Deaths from cancer in Iraq
Iraqi people who died in prison custody
Prisoners who died in Iraqi detention
Iraqi prisoners sentenced to death
Prisoners sentenced to death by Iraq
Prisoners and detainees of the United States military
Directors of intelligence agencies
Most-wanted Iraqi playing cards